In Loving Memory may refer to:

 In Loving Memory (TV series), a British period sitcom
 In Loving Memory (compilation album),a 1968 gospel music compilation album
 In Loving Memory (Beneath the Sky album), 2010
 "In Loving Memory", a song by Alter Bridge from their album One Day Remains Mark wrote this song after his Mother past away.
 "In Loving Memory", a song by Bullet for my Valentine from the deluxe edition of Venom (Bullet for My Valentine album)